A Reason To Live is the second album from Contemporary Christian music singer Cindy Morgan. It was released in 1993 by Word Records and earned Morgan a Dove award as Female Vocalist of the Year. The song "I Will Be Free" also received a Dove Award for Short Form Music Video of the Year at the 25th GMA Dove Awards in 1994.

Track listing

Personnel 
 Cindy Morgan – lead vocals, backing vocals (1–9)
 Mark Hammond – keyboard programming (1–9), bass and drum programming (1–9), arrangements (1–10), backing vocals (2–5, 8), programming (10)
 Brian Green – keyboards (9), acoustic piano (9, 10), programming (10), strings (10), arrangements (10)
 Jerry McPherson – electric guitar (5), guitars (7)
 Billy Crockett – gut-string guitar (5)
 Jackie Street – bass guitar (2)
 Craig Nelson – bass guitar (9)
 John Hammond – drums (9)
 Mervyn Warren – backing vocals (1)
 Michael Mellett – backing vocals (3, 5)
 Geoffrey Thurman – backing vocals (6)
 Chris Willis – backing vocals (6)
 Tina Hutchison – backing vocals (7)
 Tabitha Fair – backing vocals (8)
 Vicky Vaughn – backing vocals (8)

Choir on "We Can Live Together"
 Grant Cunningham, Tina Hutchinson, Michael Mellett, Cindy Morgan and Kip Raines

Production
 John Mays – executive producer
 Mark Hammond – producer
 Ronnie Brookshire – recording, mixing
 Dave Dillbeck – additional engineer, assistant engineer
 Todd Robbins – additional engineer
 Shawn McLean – assistant engineer
 Paul Skaife – assistant engineer
 Ken Love – mastering at MasterMix (Nashville, Tennessee)
 Brent Lenthall – production assistance
 Kim Sagmiller – production coordination, art direction
 Loren Balman – art direction
 Randall Lockwood – design
 Patrick Pollei – design
 Mark Tucker – photography
 Claudia McConnell-Fowler – stylist
 Alvaro Alarcon – hair, make-up
 Mike Atkins – management

References

External links
Cindy Morgon, "A Reason To Live" Review
A Reason to Live Review

1993 albums
Cindy Morgan (singer) albums